Adalpahari railway station is a railway station on the Jasidih–Dumka–Rampurhat line under the Howrah railway division of the Eastern Railway. It is situated beside Narayanpur Road at Chakaipur, Adalpahari, Birbhum district in the Indian state of West Bengal.

History
 to  railway line became operational on 12 July 2011 and Dumka to  track was set up in June 2014. The track from Rampurhat to Pinargaria became operational on 25 November 2012. The complete single railway route from Dumka to Rampurhat, including Adalpahari railway station became operational on 4 June 2015.

References

Railway stations in Birbhum district
Howrah railway division